Fitoussi is a Maghrebi Jewish surname. Notable people with the surname include:

 Alice Fitoussi (1916 - 1978) Algerian singer and musician of Jewish origin
Bruno Fitoussi (born 1958), French poker player
Grégory Fitoussi (born 1976), French actor
Jean-Paul Fitoussi (1942–2022), French economist
Marc Fitoussi (born 1974), French film director and screenwriter
Michèle Fitoussi (born 1954), French writer

Maghrebi Jewish surnames
Arabic-language surnames
Surnames of Algerian origin